Hellcat Records is an independent record label based in Los Angeles, California. The label, an offshoot of Epitaph Records, was started as a partnership between Brett Gurewitz of Bad Religion, the owner of Epitaph, and Tim Armstrong of Rancid, who was generally responsible for signing bands.

Hellcat published its Give 'Em the Boot label sampler in multiple volumes starting in 1997.

Films 

In 2005, a Give 'Em the Boot DVD was released, featuring tour footage of numerous Hellcat bands.

On January 15, 2006, the label released Live Freaky! Die Freaky!, a full-length film produced by Tim Armstrong and filmed using marionettes. The plot involves Charlie Manson's story being misinterpreted by a nomad on a post-apocalyptic Earth. It features the voice talents of the members of Rancid, Green Day, AFI and the Transplants.

Bands

Active roster 

Tim Timebomb
Charged GBH
Civet
The Creepshow
Danny Diablo
Devil's Brigade
Grade 2
HorrorPops
The Interrupters
Left Alone
Nekromantix
Orange
Rancid
Rat Boy
The Slackers
Society's Parasites
Static Thought
The Strangers
The Unseen
Westbound Train

Former bands 

The Aggrolites
Blue Fire City
Choking Victim
Dave Hillyard and the Rocksteady Seven
The Distillers
Dropkick Murphys 
F-Minus
The Gadjits
The Heart Attacks
Hepcat
The Independents
Joe Strummer and the Mescaleros
King Django
Lars Frederiksen and the Bastards
Leftöver Crack
Los Difuntos
The Luchagors
Mercy Killers
The Mighty Mighty Bosstones
Mouthwash
The Nerve Agents
Operation Ivy (re-release only)
The Pietasters
Roger Miret and the Disasters
Street Dogs
Tiger Army
Time Again
Transplants
U.S. Bombs
U.S. Roughnecks
Union 13

References

External links 
Official site
Official Hellcat fan site

 
Record labels established in 1997
Vanity record labels
Hardcore record labels
Horror punk record labels
Punk record labels
Ska record labels
American companies established in 1997